Gokul is a municipality (or nagar panchayat) in the Mathura district of the Indian state of Uttar Pradesh.

Gokul may also refer to:

Gokul Suresh, Indian film actor
Gokul (director), Indian film director
Gokul (restaurant), Mumbai
Commiphora wightii or Indian bdellium-tree, a flowering plant

See also
Gokula (died 1670), Jat chieftain